Adam Craig may refer to:
 Adam Craig (cyclist) (born 1981), American  mountain biker
 Adam Craig (singer-songwriter), American country music singer-songwriter
 Adam Craig (runner) (born 1995), British long-distance runner
 Adam Jamal Craig (born 1978), American actor